Calvert Richard Jones (4 December 1804 – 7 November 1877) was a Welsh mathematician and painter, best known for his seascapes.

Life and work
Jones belonged to a wealthy Swansea family. He was educated at Eton and Oriel College, Oxford, and was rector of Loughor. He was a friend of both John Dillwyn Llewelyn and Christopher Rice Mansel Talbot, and thus moved in the same circles as Henry Fox Talbot. Jones is credited with having taken the first photograph in Wales, a daguerrotype of Margam Castle, in 1841, but he did not take up photography as a regular occupation. During the 1840s and 1850s, however, he took many photographs of the Swansea area, and travelled with his camera in France, Italy and Malta. He also developed his own technique for taking panoramic photographs by overlapping images.

In 1847 he inherited the Heathfield estate in Swansea, which he developed, naming Mansel Street (which still stands) after his brother. In 1853, he went to live in Brussels, later returning to Britain and settling in Bath. He died in Bath, but was buried in Swansea, at St Mary's Church; the grave was destroyed during World War II.

References

Welsh Biography On-Line

External links
 

1804 births
1877 deaths
19th-century Welsh painters
Welsh photographers
People educated at Eton College
Alumni of Oriel College, Oxford
British marine artists
Pioneers of photography
Welsh male painters
19th-century Welsh male artists